Henry L. Van Dyke, Jr. (October 3, 1928 – December 22, 2011), was an American novelist, editor, teacher and musician.

Early life
Henry Van Dyke was born in Allegan, Michigan on October 3, 1928, to an academic family. He spent his childhood in Montgomery, Alabama, where his father taught at Alabama State Teachers College.

He returned to Michigan for high school, and his first ambition was to become a concert pianist. At the time this was a very difficult role for an African-American to achieve, so he pursued a major in journalism at the University of Michigan-Ann Arbor instead.  He never abandoned the piano, though, and practiced for the rest of his life, perfecting his already-formidable technique.

Career
Van Dyke served two years in the U.S. Army after World War II, stationed in Germany, where he learned to speak German.  After graduating with an MA in 1955 he worked for a short time as a reporter for the Pittsburgh Courier, then spent two years as a scientific editor at the Engineering Research Institute of the University of Michigan, with some true confessions-type hackwork on the side.

While at Michigan, he had won an Avery Hopwood Award for Fiction, which steered him toward creative writing. After moving to New York and getting on the editorial staff of Basic Books he settled down to serious writing in his spare time, and in 1965 his first novel, Ladies of the Rachmaninoff Eyes was picked up by Farrar, Straus, and Giroux. He would later write three more novels.  His shorter pieces appeared in Transatlantic Review, Antioch Review, Story Quarterly and The O. Henry Prize Stories.

Starting in 1969, he taught Creative Writing at Kent State University, shuttling between Kent, Ohio, and New York City, where he had an apartment in Kips Bay, on the East River. He retired from Kent State University in 1993 and concentrated on writing his memoirs for posthumous publication.

Personal life

Van Dyke had many friendships that crossed all racial and class lines, including Carl Van Vechten, who photographed him, Oxford don and writer Iris Murdoch, Bobby Short, whom he visited in the South of France, Patricia Neal, whom he took to the Carlyle to hear Bobby Short, Gore Vidal and Lord Edward Montagu. Van Dyke also liked to describe his encounters with opera divas Jessye Norman and Leontyne Price.

Beyond opera, his musical tastes were broad, ranging from Brahms and Scriabin to jazz.

Awards
Van Dyke won a Guggenheim Fellowship in 1971 and, in 1974, a Richard Rodgers Award from the American Academy of Arts and Letters.

Death
He died of heart failure on December 22, 2011, at the Mary Manning Walsh Nursing Home, to which he had recently moved when he felt he was failing and nearing the end.

Works

Fiction
Ladies of the Rachmaninoff Eyes (Farrar, Straus and Giroux, 1965)
Blood of Strawberries (Farrar, Straus and Giroux, 1969)
The Dead Piano (Farrar, Straus and Giroux,1971, reprinted by W. W. Norton, 1997)
Lunacy and Caprice (W.W. Norton and Company 1987, Ballantine Books, 1987)

References 

 Granville Hicks, "Literary Horizons", Saturday Review, January 4, 1969, p. 93.
 Edward G. McGhee, "Henry Van Dyke", in DLB, vol. 33, Afro-American 
 Thadious M. Davis and Trudier Harris (eds), Fiction Writers after 1955, 1984, pp. 250–255
 William L. Andrews, Frances Smith Foster and Trudier Harris (eds), The Concise Oxford Companion to African American Literature, Oxford University Press (2001)  
 Robert Fleming, The African American Writer's Handbook: How to Get in Print and Stay in Print (African-American author profiles, p. 242)

1928 births
2011 deaths
20th-century American male writers
20th-century American novelists
American male novelists
University of Michigan alumni